Toppan is a surname. Notable people with the surname include: 

Gianni Toppan (1920–1987), Italian footballer
Jane Toppan (1854–1938), American serial killer, "Jolly Jane"
Juri Toppan (born 1990), Italian footballer

See also
Toppin